Francesc Josep Catalán de Ocón was Bishop of Urgel and ex officio Co-Prince of Andorra from 1757 to 1762.

References

18th-century Princes of Andorra
Bishops of Urgell
18th-century Roman Catholic bishops in Spain
Year of birth missing
Year of death missing